Katyń Memorial may refer to:

Katyń Memorial (Jersey City), in Jersey City, New Jersey
National Katyń Memorial, in Baltimore, Maryland

See also
List of Katyn massacre memorials